Etta Candy is a fictional character appearing in DC Comics publications and related media, commonly as the best friend of the superhero Wonder Woman. Spirited and vivacious, with a devil-may-care attitude, Etta debuted as a young white woman with red hair in 1942's Sensation Comics #2, written by Wonder Woman's creator William Moulton Marston. 

Enrolled in the fictional Holliday College for Women (and often accompanied by her fellow students, "the Holliday Girls"), Etta would become a constant feature of Wonder Woman's Golden Age adventures, effectively functioning as both the hero's plucky sidekick and her best friend. Unapologetically proud of her plus-sized figure (and vocal about her love of sweets), "Etta's appearance was a stark contrast to the svelte, wasp-waisted women depicted in most comic books, and Etta was a brave and heroic leader who was always in the thick of the fight beside her friend Wonder Woman." Though appearing less frequently in the Silver and Bronze Age, Etta was a recurring presence in Wonder Woman's supporting cast throughout both periods. She would be re-imagined in March 1987 by comics writer/artist George Pérez as part of his post-Crisis relaunch of the Wonder Woman mythos. This milder-mannered version, a former U.S. Air Force captain and intelligence officer, is not presented as Wonder Woman's best friend, but rather as a genial ally among a larger cast of supporting characters. 

In 2011, Etta was again updated as part of DC Comics' company-wide New 52 continuity reboot. Still an American intelligence specialist, the rebooted Etta Candy is a Black woman, whose revised history with Wonder Woman restores several Golden Age elements, notably her wise-cracking joie de vivre and her status as the hero's ever-present best friend. Additionally, the New 52 Etta is queer, shown to have a romantic relationship with Barbara Ann Minerva, the British archeologist who would become Wonder Woman's arch-foe the Cheetah. Etta's brassy queerness brings to the surface a consistent lesbian subtext present in William Moulton Marston's original Golden Age characterization of a woman joyously defiant of sex-gender norms.

Beatrice Colen portrayed Etta in the 1970s Wonder Woman series. The character made her cinematic debut in the DC Extended Universe in the 2017 film Wonder Woman, played by Lucy Davis. She has been portrayed in animated film by voice actors Julianne Grossman and Adrienne C. Moore.

Character history

Golden Age

In her 1940s introduction, Etta Candy is a sickly malnourished woman Wonder Woman discovers at a local hospital. [Note, this version is from the Wonder Woman comic strip and written after Etta's first appearance in the comic books in Sensation Comics #2 in 1942.] When next seen, Etta is transformed into a spirited, rotund young woman who has a great love of candy. When Wonder Woman asks about her new body type, Etta tells her that she was rejuvenated by eating many sweets. With her newfound confidence, Etta Candy soon after leads the fictional Beeta Lambda sorority at Holliday College and aids Wonder Woman in her adventures. First, with a hundred other Holliday girls, Etta helps Wonder Woman take over the Nazi base of Doctor Poison without endangering Steve Trevor. Throughout her adventures with Wonder Woman, Etta is known for her moxie, her love of candy, and for her trademark call "Woo! Woo!" (A catch-phrase derived, in part, from exclamations associated with comic actor Hugh Herbert and Curly Howard of The Three Stooges. Other versions of the character have been known to say "Woo! Woo!" and according to at least one version it is a sorority cry at Holliday College.) Other familiar characteristics included her jalopy car nicknamed Esmerelda, and a variety of sassy interjections, such as: "For the love of chocolate!"

Her father, Hard Candy, and mother, Sugar Candy, lived on the Bar-L Ranch in Brazos County, Texas, that provided the setting for cowboy-themed adventures. She was shown to have a brother named Mint Candy who served as a soldier in the US Army. Holliday College was the setting for science-driven stories and it was at nearby "Starvard" (portmanteau of Stanford and Harvard), that her boyfriend, the gangling but very loving "Oscar Sweetgulper," studied. She was shown to be brave and even stormed a Nazi concentration camp armed with nothing but a box of candy to rescue captured children. She was also welcomed by Wonder Woman's people, the Amazons of Paradise Island, and even invited to their festivals. She was aware of her weight but never let it bother her. She even joked about it when asked by the Amazons if she would like to join in one of their sporting events.

Silver and Bronze Age
When Robert Kanigher became writer and editor of the adventures of Wonder Woman, he made little use of Etta Candy and the Holiday girls. When he did, he portrayed Etta as an insecure, weight-conscious girl who followed but never led the girls in her sorority. This was in sharp contrast to Marston characterization of a bold, sassy, wisecracking leader. Despite a few appearances after Kanigher reintroduced her in 1960 (Wonder Woman #117) Candy was left in limbo for decades.

Etta Candy was revived twenty years later in 1980 (Wonder Woman #272), along with Steve Trevor and General Phil Darnell. In the years since her last appearance, Candy had not only graduated from Holiday College, but had become a Lieutenant and was on hand to welcome Wonder Woman back to her old job as Air Force officer Diana Prince something she hadn't done since 1968. Lieutenant Candy was featured as a secretary to Darnell and as Diana's roommate. Despite having been Wonder Woman's friend years previous, Candy had never met Diana Prince or learned her secret identity. Thus, from Candy's point of view, she and Prince met for the first time when Prince returned to the Air Force.

She was still portrayed as insecure and weight-conscious and, although she no longer said "for the love of chocolate", was known to swear by Betty Crocker. She also did most of the cooking between herself and her roommate. Her family was not expanded as much as was the family of  her golden age incarnation though she did remark on being from a large family and had a niece named Suzie. Her love interest was now nerdy, hopelessly clumsy but nevertheless very loving Howard Huckaby.

In one adventure, Etta was kidnapped by Satanists influenced by Klarion the Witch Boy and sent to Hell, where Wonder Woman and Etrigan the demon had to travel to save her, although she remained narcotized and catatonic throughout the ordeal.

In the years leading up to Crisis on Infinite Earths (1986), writers Dan Mishkin and Mindy Newell took Etta in a different direction. She displayed more confidence, and even became Wonder Woman for one evening, battling Cheetah, Angle Man, Captain Wonder and Silver Swan. Huckaby, who by then had been convinced for several issues that his girlfriend was the comic book's titular heroine, used Dr. Psycho's machine that could turn his dreams into reality to let the world see Etta as he saw her. After the Amazonian "Wonder Etta" defeated the villains, she and others saw she was his Wonder Woman.

Post-Crisis
After the 1987 Greg Potter–George Pérez revamp of Wonder Woman, Etta was romantically linked with, and eventually married to, Steve Trevor, who was no longer Diana's love interest.

A career Air Force officer, Etta served as Steve Trevor's aide when he was framed for treason as part of Ares' scheme to spark a global war. Etta was fiercely dedicated to her friends, and her faith in Steve's innocence helped him clear his name, even though the two temporarily became fugitives while helping Wonder Woman overthrow Ares' plans. While on the run, Steve and Etta realized their love for one another. A happy couple, they remained friends with Wonder Woman.

Feeling insecure about her weight, Etta developed an eating disorder that was kept secret from her friends. She was able to lose 20 pounds, but at the expense of her health. When she finally collapsed due to a lack of food in front of Wonder Woman while trying on wedding gowns, Diana advised her to take better care of herself and maintain a sensible diet. Since that time, Etta has gained her original weight back.

Etta and Steve largely disappeared from the pages of Wonder Woman during the run of writer/artist John Byrne, and they appeared infrequently since then. She did appear once Diana lost her royal title during writer Phil Jimenez's run as her usual supportive friend, but was depicted as still insecure about her heavy weight and apprehensive about her marriage to Steve.

Writer Gail Simone later reintroduced Etta Candy as an intelligence officer requested by Sarge Steel to report on Diana Prince and her associations. This took place following the Infinite Crisis which altered Diana's origins and to an extent the origins of her supporting cast. Etta remained married to Steve Trevor and was a close friend of Diana and was also aware of Diana's dual identity. The full extent of her history with Diana following the new DCU continuity is not known.

Etta joined Wonder Woman on the Khund homeworld to convince an alien race called the 'Ichor' to cease their attacks. She was successful but returned to Earth only to be tortured by the villain Genocide, leaving her in a coma state. She eventually regained consciousness in the hospital some time during the next few issues, and after imploring Diana to not feel guilty over her torture at the hands of Genocide revealed that she was recruited as an operative by Mr. Terrific and The Green Lantern as part of the U.N. Authority's observation of the D.M.A. three years earlier.

The New 52
In September 2011, The New 52 rebooted DC's continuity. In this new timeline, Etta Candy appeared in the new Justice League title as Steve Trevor's secretary. She was now African American and depicted as young and ambitious, resembling the Etta played by Tracie Thoms in the unaired David E. Kelley Wonder Woman pilot. Trevor soon came to trust Etta, admitting to her secrets he kept close to himself, such as being in love with Wonder Woman.

During the Forever Evil storyline, Steve Trevor returned to the ruins of Washington DC's A.R.G.U.S. headquarters where Etta Candy told him that the destruction was caused by a massive spike in Doctor Light's body where the energies emitted from it exposed the A.R.G.U.S. agents. Etta Candy was later approached by an energy manifestation of Doctor Light.

Rebirth
After the events of Rebirth, Etta Candy continued working with Steve Trevor, but has been promoted to Commander Candy. Flashbacks throughout the story revealed Etta became friends with Dr. Barbara Minerva prior to becoming Cheetah and developed romantic feelings for her, which Barbara was implied to have returned. Etta is later referenced as working closely with A.R.G.U.S., a government group skilled in dealing with the super-human and super-natural.

Other versions

Seven Soldiers
Writer Grant Morrison used an aged version of Etta as a counselor in the first issue of Seven Soldiers: Zatanna and showed her as a convention speaker in Seven Soldiers: Bulleteer.

Earth-Two
During DC Comics' Pre-Crisis era, the Golden Age versions of its characters were revived. They were retroactively said to have lived on an alternate dimension dubbed Earth-Two thus explaining why the regular Wonder Woman and her supporting cast could appear youthful despite the "original" Wonder Woman having appeared decades earlier. Etta Candy was no exception although her Earth-Two self differed slightly from her Golden Age self. For example, she was shown working for the military instead of being a college student. (Thus was done in order to tie into the popular Wonder Woman television series which was set in the 1940s in order to utilize the titular heroine's Golden Age adventures. (Wonder Woman #229)) In order to harmonize the two versions, it was later explained that this Etta Candy was a college student but had put her studies on hold to serve her country. At war's end, she resumed her studies and became a dietitian. Later appearances of the Earth-Two Etta Candy show her being much more faithful to her Golden Age self.

Superman & Batman: Generations
She makes an appearance in the Superman & Batman: Generations miniseries by John Byrne. Generations takes a different approach from the aforementioned example by imagining a world wherein superheroes age in real time relative to their original appearance in comic books. Thus, by 1953 Etta Candy is happily married to Oscar Sweetgulper, her Golden Age beau, and is Mrs. Etta Candy Sweetgulper.

Wonder Woman: Amazonia
She appears in Wonder Woman: Amazonia, a Wonder Woman story set in a Victorian Britain. There, Etta grew up a hungry, homeless, destitute orphan on the streets of London. Her only friend was Diana, the girl that would grow up to be Wonder Woman. After they grew up and Diana was offered a job in show business exhibiting her great strength, Etta bid goodbye to her friend. She married an army man but she was forced to take up prostitution in order to survive after he took to drink and abandoned her. When she and Diana were reunited years later, she managed to get a job as a nanny for Diana's children, one of whom was named Etta in honor of her mother's best friend. At the climax of the story, the villain tries to kidnap Wonder Woman's daughters (among other things) but Etta bravely rescues them. It closes with Etta Candy as governess to the Princesses Etta and Victoria and best friend to their mother Queen Diana of Britain and Themyscira.

Wednesday Comics
Etta appears as a major supporting character in the Wonder Woman story serialized in Wednesday Comics. In the alternate reality featured in the storyline, Etta is a teenager who befriends the young Diana when she first arrives in America. Etta is eventually kidnapped by Diana's other friend, Priscilla Rich, and is used as bait in a trap set by Doctor Poison. With Etta bound and gagged by Priscilla, Poison attempts to use her as a test subject for her chemicals, only to be defeated when Diana arrives and rescues her friend.

Convergence: Wonder Woman
A Pre-Crisis version of Etta appears in "Convergence: Wonder Woman". She alerts Wonder Woman to a doomsday cult which has risen from the events of Convergence. She tries to save Wonder Woman from the fanatical followers, but is spirited away by the vampire Joker from the Red Rain universe. Wonder Woman finds her bitten and drained, though she subsequently becomes a vampire in service of the Joker. She is killed when Steve Trevor, also made a vampire, resists the Joker's control and plunges both of them into a deep chasm opened during the battle.

Sensation Comics Featuring Wonder Woman
In Neil Kleid's "Ghosts and Gods," his addition to the collaborative collection "Sensation Comics featuring Wonder Woman Volume 1," Etta is seen as an active sidekick to the Amazonian Princess, helping her raid Ra's Al Ghul's stronghold. Etta shows skill with a grappling hook during the adventure. Etta doesn't get to say much for herself, because when the pair is captured, "Deadman" inhabits her body to help Wonder Woman complete the mission.

The All-New Batman: The Brave and the Bold
Etta makes an appearance in the comic book version of Batman: The Brave and the Bold.

Wonder Woman: Earth One
Etta appears in Wonder Woman: Earth One, but renamed Beth. She's similar to the Pre-Crisis Earth-Two version, being a spirited, plump young woman and the head of the Holiday Girls. She appears to be a lesbian (or possibly bisexual) as she's intrigued by Wonder Woman's stories of Themyscira, an island full of women, but is put off by their attitudes as it "spoil[s] [her] fantasy".  She and the Holiday Girls also designed Wonder Woman's costume. She accompanied Wonder Woman and Steve Trevor to Themyscira for Wonder Woman's trial to defend her; all the other Amazons (except Hippolyta) were disgusted by her appearance.

The Legend of Wonder Woman
 Etta Candy appears as a major supporting character in this alternate re-telling of Wonder Woman's origin. The Holliday Girls are also featured in supporting roles.

Smallville Season Eleven
Etta Candy appears as a Lieutenant of United States Air Force. She was described as an excellent pilot and was chosen to escort Queen Hippolyta back to Themyscira. She called her plane the "invisible plane".

In other media

Television

 Beatrice Colen portrayed Etta in the first season of Wonder Woman which aired from 1976 and 1977 on ABC. She was General Phil Blankenship's secretary in this television series. This version of the character was plump rather than obese. Although she was still clearly there to provide comic relief, the show decided to not make fun of her weight. Instead, the writers portrayed her as a woman of very limited intelligence.
 Tracie Thoms played Etta in David E Kelley's 2011 unaired Wonder Woman pilot.

Film
 Etta Candy appears in the animated direct-to-DVD film, Wonder Woman, voiced by California-born actress Julianne Grossman. In this film, Etta is a slim secretary to Steve Trevor who shamelessly uses her feminine charm on her colleague much to Diana's disgust.
 Etta Candy is portrayed by Lucy Davis in the 2017 Wonder Woman film, in the character's first live action theatrical appearance. In this version, she is portrayed as red-haired and British, and works as Steve Trevor's secretary. In Wonder Woman 1984, an elderly Etta is seen in a photograph with Diana near the shore of New York City, implying that they remained good friends.
 Etta Candy appears in the animated film Wonder Woman: Bloodlines as an openly lesbian African-American, voiced by Adrienne C. Moore.

Video games
 In the video game Justice League Heroes, one of the buildings is a restaurant called "Etta's" including a classic image of the character.
 In Scribblenauts Unmasked: A DC Comics Adventure, three versions of Etta Candy are among the thousands of characters that can be summoned by the player.

See also
 List of Wonder Woman supporting characters

Footnotes

External links
 Fanzing 37 - Etta Candy

Comics characters introduced in 1942
Characters created by William Moulton Marston
Characters created by H. G. Peter
DC Comics sidekicks
DC Comics LGBT characters
Wonder Woman characters
DC Comics female characters
Fictional United States Air Force personnel
Fictional commanders
Fictional female lieutenants
Fictional military lieutenants
Fictional female corporals
Fictional secretaries
Fictional bisexual females
Fictional lesbians
Fictional female captains
Fictional military captains